Shannon Carroll Smyth (born 22 June 1987) is an Irish American soccer coach and former player. During her career she represented the Republic of Ireland women's national football team and the Norwegian Toppserien clubs Donn Toppfotball and Amazon Grimstad.

College career
Smyth played varsity soccer during four years at the University of Louisville. She represented Ireland in the 2007 Summer Universiade in Bangkok.

Club career
After graduation Smyth featured in the 2009 W-League for FC Indiana.

In January 2010 Smyth agreed a one–year professional contract with newly promoted Toppserien club Donn Toppfotball. When Donn went bankrupt in November 2010, Smyth joined five teammates in signing for nearby Amazon Grimstad for the 2011 season.

International career
Smyth has dual Irish–American citizenship as her father Brendan was born and raised in Dún Laoghaire. She attended the Republic of Ireland national team's American summer training camps in 2008 and 2009.

In August 2010 Smyth was called into the Republic of Ireland squad for their final World Cup qualifiers. She then won her first cap for Ireland in a 2–0 friendly defeat in the Netherlands. Smyth started the game wearing number ten and playing in central midfield. Further appearances followed in the qualifiers against Russia and Israel.

She announced her retirement from soccer in November 2014 and confirmed her decision in August 2015. She won 33 caps for Ireland. Her only goal was scored against Northern Ireland at the 2013 Cyprus Cup.

International goals
Scores and results list Ireland's goal tally first.

References

External links

Shannon Smyth at UEFA
Shannon Smyth at Donn Toppfotball
Shannon Smyth at Louisville Cardinals

1987 births
Living people
Republic of Ireland women's association footballers
Republic of Ireland women's international footballers
Expatriate women's footballers in Norway
American people of Irish descent
Toppserien players
Women's association football midfielders
Women's association football forwards
Amazon Grimstad players
FK Donn players
Irish expatriate sportspeople in Norway
F.C. Indiana players
Soccer players from Wisconsin